The Highway Safety Manual (HSM) is a publication of the American Association of State Highway Transportation Officials.  It contains concepts, guidelines, and computational procedures for predicting the safety performance of various highway facilities.

The HSM was published in 2010 and is divided into four sections:
Part A – Introduction, Human Factors, and Fundamentals of Safety;
Part B – Roadway Safety Management Process;
Part C – Predictive Methods; and
Part D – Crash Modification Factors.

See also
Highway Capacity Manual

Transportation Research Board

American Association of State Highway and Transportation Officials

References

External links
FHWA Office of Safety Highway Safety Manual page http://safety.fhwa.dot.gov/hsm/

Crash Modification Factor Clearing House http://www.cmfclearinghouse.org/

Road transportation in the United States
Road traffic management